Rail transport in Slovakia began on 21 September 1840, with the opening of the first horse-powered line from Bratislava to Svätý Jur (at that time in Kingdom of Hungary). The first steam-powered line, from Bratislava to Vienna, opened on 20 August 1848.

The modern Železnice Slovenskej republiky company was established in 1993 as a successor of the Československé státní drahy in Slovakia. Until 1996 it had formal monopoly on railroad transportation in the country, which remained a de facto monopoly until the advent of private operators entering the network in the early 2010s. Private passenger service operator includes RegioJet, which operates trains between Prague (Czech Republic) and Košice, Žilina and Košice, Žilina and Bratislava  and on the Komárno - Dunajská Streda - Bratislava route. Bratislava-Komárno route is operated now by ŽSR. The other private operator is Leo Express which operates trains on Prague-Košice/Prešov route. There are plans to win more tenders in Slovakia.

Since 2002 a law divided the company: ŽSR was left with infrastructure maintenance and passenger and cargo transport was moved into company "Železničná spoločnosť, a. s." (ZSSK). In 2005 this new company was further split into "Železničná spoločnosť Slovensko, a. s." (ZSSK) providing Passenger transport services and "Železničná spoločnosť Cargo Slovakia, a. s." (ZSSK Cargo) providing cargo services. Freight transport is operated by ZSCS and around 30 private companies.

Slovakia is a member of the International Union of Railways (UIC). The UIC Country Code for Slovakia is 56.

History

Railway has become an important prerequisite for economic and social development of the country. In 1837 the construction of the first European Railway Highway started. Its construction became a potential threat to market of agricultural goods and timber from western Slovakia. Therefore, a company was founded to build a horse railway that would link the five royal cities between Bratislava and Trnava. The service was providing until the first half of the 19th century. At beginning, the construction of the railway was in the hands of the state. Later, in year 1854, the state entrusted railway building to private entrepreneurs.

1867–1873
The intensity of construction changed after settlement in 1867. Ministry of Transport and Public Works was established. Its main objective was construction of transport communications independent of Austria. In Slovakia this meant extensive construction of railways.

In the period between 1867 and 1873 a number of major railways were built:
Košice – Žilina – Bohumín
Pešť – Fiľakovo – Lučenec – Zvolen – Vrútky
Michaľany – Humenné – Medzilaborce – Lupkov – Przemysl
Košice – Michaľany – Slovenské Nové Mesto – Čop
Bratislava – Trenčín
Prešov – Orlov – Tarnov
Fiľakovo – Plešivec – Dobšiná, Jesenské – Tisovec

Hungary tried to use private capital for railway construction. The lack of funds threatened the construction of railways and Hungary started in 1868 to build railways on its own.

The railway construction was accompanied by a series of scandals and corruption affairs among aristocracy, politicians and businessmen. In spite of this fact, the basis of the railway network was set up in relatively short time.

1873–1918
Bankruptcy of the Vienna stock exchange was the beginning of an economic crisis affecting the economy of the monarchy throughout the first half of the 70th of the 19th century. Changing economic circumstances was reflected on the further construction of railways. During this period, the country was aware of the strategic importance of railway transportation for economy and policy.

The state responded to the situation with a number of actions: stopped the construction of expensive railways and created legal conditions for the construction of local railways.

1918–1939
After the formation of Czechoslovakia, the most important task was to maintain and run the rail network defined by the new boundaries. Two divisions, which were set up in the cities Košice and Bratislava, were responsible for the network managing. Slovakia inherited rail network that was insufficient for the new state requirements.

The only one efficient line was Košice-Bohumín. The state therefore decided to take over the operation of all private railways and extend the rail lines. The pressure of competition from the road freight transport stimulated further developments. The speed of freight trains was increased up to 70 km/h by applying continuous braking. Significant progress in passenger traffic was achieved by motorization of local railways.

1939–1945

On 3 March 1939 the Slovak State was established. However, it was dependent on Germany. The war caused high intensity of freight transport. The key role was played by export of raw materials, agricultural and food products. Passenger transport was characterized by extensive seasonal movements of agricultural and industrial workers from Poland, Slovakia, Ukraine and Russia travelling to Germany.

1945–1992
After the World War II, Czechoslovakia was renewed. The first task needed to be solved was the reconstruction of the rail network. In the 1948, the regime of communism began. All private railways were nationalized. The overloaded line Čierna nad Tisou – Košice Žilina – Bohumín was the drive to extend the rail network on the South of Slovakia.
At the same time, the electrification of railways was carried out.

The new constitution in 1960 defined Czechoslovakia as a socialist state. Rail transport was marked on Joseph Stalin's conception of "iron and steel". There was strong emphasis on transport of raw materials, building materials, fuels and food.

Industrialization had a significant impact on the growth of passenger transport—people traveled to work and school over large distances. The growth in intensity caused imbalance between demand and technical capabilities. The situation became relaxed during the 1970s due to the development of individual car transport and the intensity of rail transport started declining.

From 1993
On 1 January 1993 Slovak Republic became independent. At the same time, the Železnice Slovenskej Republiky were established. The bad initial situation requested measures to execute consolidation as quick as possible. The most important was to create conditions for privatization and to optimize rail activity for business requirements.
The strategic objective was to provide access to European Union trade market and capitalize on convenient territory of Slovak Republic and its touristic attractiveness.

Intermodal Traffic from China
In 2017 a trial container service from Dalian in China to the SPaP port on the River Danube in Bratislava arrived in the Slovak capital on November 13, after a 17-day journey via Russia and Ukraine. The 41 containers carrying goods worth more than US$3m including electronics and machine parts were transhipped between gauges at the Manzhouli/Zabaykalsk crossing between China and Russia and at Dobrá on the Ukraine/Slovakia border, where the freight facility has two gantry cranes and a transhipment capacity of up to 200 000 containers per year.

Companies

 Železnice Slovenskej republiky (ŽSR) - state-owned railway infrastructure operator in Slovakia
 RegioJet - private passenger railway operator
 LEO Express - private passenger railway operator
 Arriva - private passenger railway operator
 Čierny Hron Railway (ČHŽ) -  narrow gauge heritage railway owned by villages on the ČHŽ lines
 The Historical Logging Switchback Railway in Vychylovka (HLÚŽ or OKLŽ) - a  narrow gauge heritage railway owned by the Museum of Kysuce
 Nitra Agricultural Museum Railway (NPŽ) -  narrow gauge railway
 Železničná spoločnosť Slovensko a. s. (ZSSK) - state-owned passenger train Operator
 Železničná spoločnosť Cargo Slovakia a. s.(ZSSK Cargo or ZSCS) - state-owned freight train Operator

Statistics 
Data taken from Year bulletin of ŽSR 2006 (in Slovak)
Total length of lines: 
Single track: 
Double or more track: 
 broad gauge: 
 standard gauge: 
Narrow gauge: 
  of  gauge;  of  gauge)
Electrified: 

As of December 31, 2010
 75 tunnels measuring 43.228 kilometers
 2321 railway bridges measuring 52.154 kilometers
 8529 railroad switches

Rail links to adjacent countries 
 Same gauge 
 Austria  —  voltage change 25 kV AC/15 kV AC
 Czech Republic  —  same voltage 3 kV DC or 25 kV AC
 Hungary  — same voltage 25 kV AC (at Rusovce-Rajka, Komárno-Komárom and Štúrovo-Szob crossings) or voltage change 3 kV DC/25 kV AC (at Kechnec-Hidasnémeti and Slovenské Nové Mesto-Sátoraljaújhely crossing)
 Poland  —  same voltage 3 kV DC
 Break-of-gauge /
 Ukraine — voltage 3 kV DC

See also
 History of rail transport in Slovakia
 Metro Bratislava
 Slovak rail border crossings
 Slovenská strela
 Track gauge in Slovakia
 Transport in Slovakia
 Uzhhorod–Košice broad-gauge track

References